Arwin Kardolus (born 10 August 1964) is a Dutch fencer. He competed in the individual and team épée events at the 1988 Summer Olympics.

References

External links
 

1964 births
Living people
Dutch male fencers
Olympic fencers of the Netherlands
Fencers at the 1988 Summer Olympics
Sportspeople from The Hague
20th-century Dutch people